Dark Glacier is in Wenatchee National Forest in the U.S. state of Washington,  northwest of Bonanza Peak, the tallest non-volcanic peak in the Cascade Range.

See also
List of glaciers in the United States

References

Glaciers of the North Cascades
Glaciers of Snohomish County, Washington
Glaciers of Washington (state)